Zucker is a German and Jewish surname meaning "sugar". Notable people with the surname include:

Anita Zucker, American businesswoman and philanthropist
Arianne Zucker, American actress
Craig Zucker, American politician 
David Zucker (filmmaker), American film director
Gerhard Zucker, German businessman and rocket engineer
Harold Zucker, Australian rules footballer
Jason Zucker, American ice hockey player
Jeff Zucker, American television producer and former president of CNN Worldwide
Jeremy Zucker, American Singer
Jerry Zucker (film director), American film director
Jerry Zucker (businessman), American businessman
Kenneth Zucker, Canadian psychologist
Monte Zucker (died 2007), American photographer
Paul Zucker, German-born architect, art historian, art critic and author
Steven Zucker, American mathematician
Aaron Zucker, Ukrainian-American Yiddish poet, better known by his pen name A. Lutzky

References

German-language surnames
Jewish surnames